Darvish Khaki (also Romanized as Darvīsh Khākī; also known as Dhares Khākē) is a village in Najafabad Rural District, in the Central District of Bijar County, Kurdistan Province, Iran. At the 2006 census, its population was 126, in 27 families. The village is populated by Kurds.

References 

Towns and villages in Bijar County
Kurdish settlements in Kurdistan Province